Sri Maharaja Srimat Tribhuwanaraja Mauliwarmadewa was a king of Dharmasraya in Bhumi Malayu (Sumatra), as written on the Padang Roco inscription (1286). The inscription mentioned that the king and his people of Brahmin, Kshatriya, Vaishya, and Shudra classes all felt grateful to receive a gift of Paduka Amoghapasa statue from King Kertanagara, the king of Singhasari in Bhumi Java (Java).

The presence of the inscribed statue carried from Java by the Singhasari's nobles and high officials can be seen as an affirmation of  the Dharmasraya's vassalage to the Singhasari; or at least a cordial relationship between the two kingdoms.

The historian Cœdès argued that this king was related to the previous King Srimat Trailokyaraja Maulibhusana Warmadewa of Srivijaya, whose name is written on the Grahi inscription (1183) in Chaiya, Southern Thailand.

See also 
 Dharmasraya
 Mauli dynasty
 Padang Roco Inscription
 Pamalayu expedition

References 

Indonesian Buddhist monarchs
13th-century monarchs in Asia
Dharmasraya
13th-century Indonesian people